Good Life Delivery is a 2004 Argentine, French, and Dutch film, directed by Leonardo Di Cesare, and written by Di Cesare and Hans Garrino. The film features Ignacio Toselli as Hernán, Mariana Anghileri as Pato, and Oscar Nuñez as Venancio, Pato's manipulative father, among others. The film was partly funded by INCAA.

Plot
This black comedy is about average people who live in González Catán, a working-class suburb southwest of Buenos Aires, and are having a hard time making a living.

In the beginning, Hernán helps his brother and his wife get ready for a their big move to Spain. His parents are forced to leave Argentina in order to escape the ravages of the country's economic crisis. Hernán is left alone in the Buenos Aires suburbs. He works at an agency delivering messages on a small motorcycle.  One day, at a gas station, he meets Pato, an attractive woman working the pumps. Hernán invites Pato to rent the room his brother vacated.

Pato is a mysterious young woman. She realizes Hernán likes her and she decides to go along in returning his advances. Yet, Hernán is quite surprised when he comes home one night.  Pato's parents and her young daughter have moved in without giving Hernán a warning. The father, Venancio (Oscar Nuñez), a slick character, thanks Hernán, who thinks the move-in is temporary.

However, it seems that Pato's parents have come to stay. Dispossession laws in Argentina can be quite lengthy and costly. Venancio and his wife turn the kitchen into a small bakery making churros that are sold on the streets. Nothing that Hernán does to get rid of Pato's family who occupy the house.  That is until he takes matters into his own hands and scares Pato's family.

Pato, who is not able to have a relationship with Hernán, is being pursued by a handsome young man, Jose Luis, a client at the gas station. Pato realizes her chance when she discovers that Jose Luis is much wealthier than Hernán. Venancio, his wife, and the young girl appear at Jose Luis' building. In the next scene, Venancio is seated at the dinner table thanking Jose Luis with the same speech he used to thank Hernán.

Cast
 Ignacio Toselli as Hernán
 Mariana Anghileri as Pato
 Oscar Nuñez as Venancio
 Alicia Palmes as Elvira
 Sofia da Silva as Luli
 Ariel Staltari as Beto
 Pablo Ribba as Seba
 Marcelo Nacci as José Luis
 Ricardo Niz as Colifa
 Oscar Alegre as Roberto
 Hernán Ticona as Ramón
 Gabriel Goity as Dr. Linares

Background

The film's backdrop is the economic crisis Argentina faced from 1999-2002.  The poverty rate of Argentina grew from an already high 35.9% in May 2001 to a peak of 57.5% in October 2002.  In addition, the May 2000 unemployment rate was 15.4%; it climbed to 18.3% in December 2001.

Distribution
The picture was first presented at the International Film Festival Rotterdam in the Netherlands on January 27, 2004.  Later it was shown at the Toulouse Latin America Film Festival in France on March 22, 2004.

The film was screened at various film festivals, including: the Karlovy Vary Film Festival, Czech Republic; the Rencontres Internationales de Cinéma à Paris; France; Puchon International Fantastic Film Festival, South Korea; Copenhagen International Film Festival, Denmark; the Biarritz La Cita Film Festival, France; the Chicago International Film Festival, USA; the Valladolid International Film Festival, Spain; and others.

Critical reception
Deborah Young, film critic for Variety magazine and reporting from the International Film Festival Rotterdam, liked the film and wrote, "Argentina's economic crisis furnishes fertile background material in Buena Vida (Delivery), a clever social drama spiked with black humor...Well-written and acted, pic vividly conveys the country's dire straits with clenched-teeth humor and compassion for all. It should benefit from the growing aud for Argentine product...From a low-key naturalistic drama, pic turns into an ironic comedy that catches the viewer up in seemingly unsolvable social and personal problems."

Film critic Ed Gonzalez, who writes for Slant Magazine, liked the film and the way director Leonardo Di Cesare approached the material and wrote, "Nostalgia sweetly and sensitively tinges the sobering film's emotional politics, as it does in Leonardo Di Cesare's Buena Vida Delivery, the story of a female gas station employee, Pato (Mariana Anghileri), who moves in with a young man, Hernán (Ignacio Toseli), whose parents leave Argentina in order to escape the ravages of the country's economic crisis. Infinitely more charming than Daniel Burman's self-obsessed Lost Embrace, the film is a romantic comedy that accommodates the dejected mood of the country's people...where Lost Embrace worried only for its main character, Buena Vida frets for an entire nation."

British film critic K.H. Brown liked considered the film deeply ironic and wrote, "Making black comedy out of national economic disaster, the title of this Argentine drama can only be understood as deeply ironic. No one is being delivered a particularly good life. Rather, everyone is struggling to get by, doing what they feel is best for them and theirs...Straightforward, unflashy direction – one suddenly notices the previous absence of music when a few ominous chords signal the beginning of act three, for instance – is counterbalanced by well-observed and nuanced performances and a satisfactorily bittersweet resolution. If Buena Vida Delivery probably won't put film-maker Leonardo Di Cesare up there with the likes of Walter Salles and Gonzales Innaritu at the forefront of current Latin American cinema, it's a pleasing enough way to spend 90 minutes."

Awards
Wins
 Clarin Entertainment Awards: Clarin Award; Best First Work - Film; 2004.
 Mar del Plata Film Festival: Best Film, Leonardo Di Cesare; Best Screenplay, Leonardo Di Cesare and Hans Garrino: 2004.
 Toulouse Latin America Film Festival, France: Grand Prix; Leonardo Di Cesare; 2004.
 Valladolid International Film Festival, Spain: Best New Director, Leonardo Di Cesare; 2004.
 Argentine Film Critics Association Awards: Silver Condor; Best First Film, Leonardo Di Cesare; Best New Actress, Mariana Anghileri; Best Screenplay, Original, Leonardo Di Cesare and Hans Garrino; 2005.

Nominations
 Valladolid International Film Festival: Golden Spike, Leonardo Di Cesare; 2004.
 Argentine Film Critics Association Awards: Silver Condor; Best New Actor, Ignacio Toselli; Best Supporting Actor, Oscar Nuñez; 2005.

References

External links
 
 Buena vida delivery at the cinenacional.com 
 Buena Vida - Delivery  film review at La Butaca 
 Buena vida delivery film review at Cineismo.com by Josefina Sartora 
 Buena vida delivery  film review at La Nación by Adolfo C. Martínez 
  

2004 films
2004 comedy-drama films
Argentine independent films
2000s Spanish-language films
Dutch independent films
French independent films
Films set in Buenos Aires
Films shot in Buenos Aires
2004 independent films
Argentine comedy-drama films
Dutch comedy-drama films
French comedy-drama films
Spanish-language French films
2000s French films
2000s Argentine films